Upa or UPA may refer to:

Law
 Undesirable Publications Act, a 1967 Singapore statute
 Uniform Parentage Act, a model statute proposed by the U.S. NCCUSL
 Uniform Partnership Act, another model statute proposed by the U.S. NCCUSL

Organizations

Associations
 Union des producteurs agricoles, Canada
 United Patternmakers' Association, former British trade union
 United Press Association, a news agency that became United Press International
 United States Professional Poolplayers Association
 Universal Powerline Association
 Utenti Pubblicità Associati, Italian Advertisers' Association

Business
 United Productions of America, an American animation studio

Education
 Universidad de Playa Ancha, Chile
 University Preparatory Academy, San Jose, California
 University Preparatory Academy (Detroit)
 University Press of America, academic publisher

Politics
 Uganda People's Army, a rebel group active from 1987 to 1992
 Ulster Protestant Action, Ireland
 União dos Povos de Angola (National Liberation Front of Angola)
 United Progressive Alliance, India
 Ukrainian People's Army, a Ukrainian nationalist military force between 1917 and 1921
 Ukrainian Insurgent Army (Ukrayins'ka Povstans'ka Armiya), a Ukrainian nationalist paramilitary active between 1942 and 1956

Places
Upa, Azerbaijan, a village in Khizi Rayon
Upa, Estonia, village in Saaremaa Parish, Saare County, Estonia
Upa (river), a river in Russia
Úpa, a river in the Czech Republic

Science and technology
 Ultra Port Architecture, a computer bus
 Unique Particle Attribution, a mechanism to prevent ambiguity in XML Schema
 Uralic Phonetic Alphabet, a notational system for the Uralic languages
 Urokinase, an enzyme involved in the biology of humans and other animals
 Ulipristal acetate, a medication

Other
 Bridge (grappling) or upa, a move in Brazilian jiu-jitsu
 Upa, a character in Bio Miracle Bokutte Upa
 Urban Partnership Agreement, an effort by the United States Department of Transportation to reduce congestion
 Urban Protection Agency, a fictional organisation in Project Eden

See also
'upa'upa, a Tahitian dance